Harbinger is an American comic book series published by Valiant Comics about a group of teenage super-powered outcasts known as Harbingers.

Harbinger initially featured writing and art by Jim Shooter and David Lapham. After Acclaim Entertainment purchased the rights to the Valiant catalog for $65 million in 1994, the characters were rebooted in Harbinger: Acts of God to make them more easily adaptable to video games. They continued to appear in many Valiant titles, most prominently the Unity 2000 series. Harbinger was one of the best selling Valiant titles with total sales in all languages of over five million comics.

Publication history
Harbinger debuted with Harbinger #1 in January 1992.

In 2008, Valiant released Harbinger: The Beginning, a deluxe hardcover collecting the first seven issues. Harbinger: The Beginning reached #2 on Amazon.com’s graphic novels sales charts and within the top #300 of all books sold on Amazon.

In June 2012, Valiant Entertainment relaunched the Harbinger title as a new ongoing series, written by Joshua Dysart and illustrated by Khari Evans.

Characters 

 Toyo Harada - The most powerful psionic on Earth, Harada commands the full spectrum of psionic abilities, including telepathy, telekinesis, mind-control, and many other deadly talents. Fearing that humanity may eventually destroy itself, Harada decided early in his life to preserve the planet by clandestinely conquering it. To this end, he established the Harbinger Foundation to recruit others with paranormal abilities, whom Harada refers to as "Harbingers of the next step in human evolution". He seldom confronts his enemies directly, preferring to leave such dirty-work to his elite Harbinger warriors, the "Eggbreakers". With tremendous economic and political clout, Harada seems close to achieving his goals, and is ready to destroy anyone who stands in his way.
 Peter Stanchek (Sting) Sting is a psionic of extraordinary power and potential. Once a student of Toyo Harada, he decided to break away when Harada arranged the murder of Pete's best friend. Together with Kris, Zephyr, Flamingo and Torque, Sting tries to thwart the plans of Harada and his Harbinger Foundation.
 Kris Hathaway - Although not possessing super powers of her own, Kris is still an important member of Sting's renegades. Her level head and intelligence keeps the team together and in focus of their goal.
 Faith Herbert (Zephyr) Zephyr, known as Faith to her friends, has the telekinetic ability to fly. She is also able to generate a 'companion field', a telekinetic force field she can use as defensive protection against attacks for herself and/or others. So far, her field appears to deflect physical, kinetic and focused electromagnetic energy, though heat and other environmental effects may be able to travel through the field. When she expands her companion field to allies, she can levitate them within an unknown radius around her as she flies. Her force field allows air, ambient light, and sound to pass through but, at the cost of limiting the air capacity to support breathing within the field, she can intensify its impermeability to prevent even those phenomenae from entering her field. The companion field's carrying capacity is unknown. Founder of the Harbinger Resistance.
 Charlene Dupre (Flamingo)  Flamingo has the power to generate and control flames.
 John Torkelson (Torque) Torque was a mechanic in Georgia before Sting released his powers of enormous strength and durability. In the beginning, Torque seemed very hostile and distant, but he has proven himself a loyal and valuable member of the group.
 Amanda McKee (Livewire) Harada recruited Amanda and other like-minded (in other words, violent) individuals into his Eggbreakers, the squad of enforcers who did Harada's dirty work. She was given the codename Livewire, due to her power to manipulate electromagnetic forces; she especially enjoyed using a length of magnetically animated cable as a weapon.
 Edward Sedgewick (Stronghold) was a member of the Harbinger Foundation of would-be Harbinger messiah Toyo Harada. Edward was given the nickname Stronghold and recruited into the "Eggbreakers" enforcer squad. He had the power to psionically absorb mass from objects around him and use it to increase his own size and strength to gigantic proportions. When he killed a fellow Harbinger, he realized that the Foundation was not right for him and fled with his partner Livewire. Stronghold and Livewire were later recruited by the Geomancer Geoff McHenry to battle villain Doctor Eclipse, a servant of Master Darque.

Plot

Valiant Comics (1992-1995)  
Harbingers, also known as psiots, are a race of evolved superhumans with psionic powers in the Valiant Universe. The world's most powerful Harbinger is Toyo Harada, a Japanese businessman who runs the mysterious Harbinger Foundation. The Foundation recruits and trains Harbingers as part of Harada's private army. There are some who believe Harada is an evil megalomaniac, including teenager Peter Stanchek, the only Harbinger whose power rivals that of Harada. Stanchek, also known by the codename Sting, leads a group of young Harbingers called the Renegades against Harada. This group includes Charlene Dupre, a pyrokinetic codenamed Flamingo; Faith Herbert, an overweight flying nerd codenamed Zephyr; John Torkelson, a super-strong behemoth named Torque; and the regular human Kris Hathaway. They live their lives on the run while being constantly pursued by Harada's organization.

Harbinger #0 

Harbinger #0 (1993) from Valiant Comics' first volume, is the prequel to the Harbinger series and details how Peter Stanchek became involved with the Harbinger Foundation and came to oppose Harada. Each issue of Harbinger from #1 through #6 contained a numbered coupon. Each coupon also featured one panel of a six panel story by Jim Shooter that told the origin of Toyo Harada. A new hardcover collection (Harbinger: The Beginning) featured a new story by Jim Shooter, "Origin of Harada", which presumably fleshes out the story that appeared on the coupons. When a set of coupons was collected and sent to Valiant a copy of Harbinger #0 Pink Cover Mail Away Variant could be redeemed. The book became highly sought, reaching prices as high as $300 in back issue trading. A blue cover version was eventually released to meet demand. Today, the Pink Cover Mail Away Version of Harbinger #0 is still one of the most sought after Valiant books.

The #0 issue of the 2012 reboot explores instead the origin of Toyo Harada as a World War II survivor and his eventual endeavors with his conglomerate using the Harbingers as a war tool.

Awards and recognition 
Ain't It Cool News named "Harbinger" Best Superteam 2012.
Comic Book Resources named Harbinger among the Top 100 Comics of 2012.
A Comic Show named Harbinger one of the "12 Best of 2012".
MTV named Harbinger one of "MTV Geek's Best Comic Series Of 2012".
Harbinger was named among the "Top Twelve Titles of 2012" by Mind of Scott.
Comic Impact named Joshua Dysart the Best Writer in 2013.
CraveOnline named Harbinger one of the "Best Comics of 2013."
Ain't It Cool News named Toyo Harada Favorite Super Villain in 2013.
Harbinger Wars was named Best Crossover for 2013 by Ain't It Cool News.

Nominations
2014 Harvey Award Nominations:
 Best Graphic Album - Previously Published: Harbinger Volume 1: Omega Rising, Valiant Entertainment
 Most Promising New Talent: Pere Perez, Harbinger Wars, Valiant Entertainment
 Special Award for Excellence in Presentation: Harbinger Wars, Josh Johns and Warren Simons, Valiant Entertainment

Collected editions
Part of the original series has been collected into volumes:
Harbinger: Children of the Eighth Day (collects Harbinger #1–4, softcover, Valiant, 1992)
Harbinger: The Beginning (collects Harbinger #0–7 and new story by Jim Shooter, hardcover, 200 pages, August 2007)

In addition, the new series (by Joshua Dysart) is being collected into volumes as well:
Harbinger Vol. 1: Omega Rising (collects Harbinger #1–5)
Harbinger Vol. 2: Renegades (collects Harbinger #6–10)
 Harbinger Vol. 3: Harbinger Wars (collects Harbinger #11–14, 0)
 Harbinger Vol. 4: Perfect Day (collects Harbinger #15–19)
 Harbinger Vol. 5: Death of a Renegade (collects Harbinger #20–25)
 Harbinger Vol. 6: Omegas (collects Harbinger: Omega #1-3 and Harbinger: Bleeding Monk #0)
Additionally, the series has begun being collected into Deluxe Edition hardcovers:
 Harbinger: Deluxe Edition Vol. 1 (collects Harbinger #1-14, 0)
 Harbinger: Deluxe Edition Vol. 2 (collects Harbinger #15-25, Harbinger: Omegas #1-3, and Harbinger: Bleeding Monk #0.)

In other media

Film
In March 2008, it was announced that Paramount Pictures acquired the rights to a film adaptation, enlisting Brett Ratner as director. In April 2015, Valiant Entertainment, Sony Pictures and Neal H. Moritz's Original Film announced a five-picture deal to bring the publisher's heroes to the big screen, which included a Harbinger film. Moritz, Toby Jaffe and Dinesh Shamdasani would produce it from a script by Eric Heisserer. Harbinger would then have a sequel and crossover film, Harbinger Wars, with Bloodshot.

By November 2018, it was reported that Justin Tipping would direct the film, with a script co-written by Heisserer, Tipping and Joshua Beirne-Golden. However, Sony subsequently sold the rights to the Valiant Universe to Paramount Pictures in September 2019, with the film reentering development. In February 2022, Deadline reported that Wes Ball was to direct a Harbinger film written by Andrew Lanham. Later that year in June, Ball stepped down from his role so that he could focus on his role as director of a Planet of the Apes trilogy. Paul Downs Colaizzo entered early negotiations to serve as director, as well as to rewrite the previous draft of the script.

Web series
The character of Faith was initially announced to appear in the web series Ninjak vs. the Valiant Universe, although she ultimately didn't, but Livewire did.

Notes

References

See also
 X-Men, a mutant superhero team in comics published by Marvel Comics that are similar to the Harbingers.

External links 

Harbinger at the Valiant Entertainment wiki
Harbinger  at the Valiant Comics fan site

1992 comics debuts